Miya Cech (born March 4, 2007) is an American actress. She made her film debut in The Darkest Minds (2018). She then starred in Rim of the World (2019), the second revival of Are You Afraid of the Dark? (2019), The Astronauts (2020–21) and Marvelous and the Black Hole (2021).

Early life
Cech was born on March 4, 2007, in Tokyo. She was adopted at five weeks old and raised in Davis, Northern California. She is the third of four children adopted from Japan and Kazakhstan.

Career
Cech began her career as a child model, landing gigs with Gap, Ralph Lauren, Skechers, and Gymboree. She made her acting debut in a 2015 episode of the CBS police procedural Hawaii Five-0 as a young version of Grace Park's character. This was followed by further guest roles in American Horror Story and American Housewife in 2016 and 2017 respectively. In 2018, Cech made her film debut in The Darkest Minds as Zu, a mute girl who can manipulate electricity. The film received generally negative reviews, but her performance received praise. Deadline Hollywood said "Cech do[es] what [she] can with nothing", while IndieWire considered her a standout.

The following year, Cech starred in the Netflix film Rim of the World as ZhenZhen. Released on May 24, 2019, the film was negatively received by critics; Cech's performance received commendation, however. John Serba of Decider said, "Cech is my favorite, carrying the character in her sideways glances and quiet, confident swagger[.] ... She's funnier [than the males], too." Later that month, she portrayed a pre-teen version of the protagonist Sasha Tran (Ali Wong) in the Netflix film Always Be My Maybe. According to Variety, this is Cech's most well-known film role. Later that year, she starred as Akiko Yamato in the second revival of Nickelodeon's Are You Afraid of the Dark?. The series was critically acclaimed; Decider called Cech the "[s]leeper [s]tar" of the show.

From 2020 to 2021, Cech starred in the Nickelodeon drama series The Astronauts. Common Sense Media praised the child actors, calling them wonderful. Cech played a lead role of Sammy in Marvelous and the Black Hole, which premiered at the 2021 Sundance Film Festival. Critics acclaimed her performance. IndieWire stated, "[the film is] grounded by... Cech, who effectively channels the angst of teendom into an offbeat tale... [and] does solid work in immersing us in Sammy's frustration and sadness, even if the script doesn't always give her the best lines to punch with." In December 2021, she was announced to have been cast in a lead role alongside YaYa Gosselin in Apple TV+ series Surfside Girls. She will portray Jade, who seeks to "find a scientific explanation for the existence of ghosts".

Filmography

References

External links

Living people
2007 births
Actresses from Tokyo
American actresses of Japanese descent
American adoptees
American child actresses
American child models
American film actresses
American television actresses
American film actors of Asian descent
Japanese emigrants to the United States
People from Davis, California